Dana Pounds is an American track and field athlete competing in the javelin throw. In 2007, she competed in the women's javelin throw event at the 2007 World Championships in Athletics held in Osaka, Japan. She did not qualify to compete in the final.

She won the women's javelin throw event at the NCAA Division I Outdoor Track and Field Championships both in 2005 and in 2006.

In 2008, she won the women's United States Air Force Athlete of the Year award.

Personal life 

In December 2013, her husband David Lyon was killed by a car bomb in Afghanistan.

References

External links 
 

Living people
Year of birth missing (living people)
Place of birth missing (living people)
American female javelin throwers
World Athletics Championships athletes for the United States
21st-century American women